Nardulli is a surname. Notable people with the surname include:

 Ann Nardulli (1948–2018), American endocrinologist
 Giuseppe Nardulli (1947–2008), Italian physicist
 Guy Nardulli (born 1974), American actor and producer
, Italian actor
 Michael Nardulli (1920–2007), American politician